Matthew Hopkin, (born 14 April 1991 in Brisbane) is a professional squash player who represented Australia. He reached a career-high world ranking of World No. 99 in January 2015.

References

External links 

Australian male squash players
Living people
1991 births
20th-century Australian people
21st-century Australian people